The letter Ƣ (minuscule: ƣ) has been used in the Latin orthographies of various, mostly Turkic languages, such as Azeri or the Jaꞑalif orthography for Tatar. It is also included in pinyin alphabets for Kazakh and Uyghur; and in the 1928 Soviet Kurdish Latin alphabet. It usually represents a voiced velar fricative  but is sometimes used for a voiced uvular fricative . All orthographies that used the letter have been phased out and so it is not well-supported in fonts. It can still be seen in pre-1983 books published in the People’s Republic of China.

Historically, it is derived from a handwritten form of the small Latin letter q around 1900. The majuscule is then based on the minuscule. Its use for  stems from the linguistic tradition of representing such sounds (and similar ones) by q in Turkic languages and in transcriptions of Arabic or Persian (compare kaf and qaf).

In alphabetical order, it comes between G and H.

Modern replacements 
 Abaza: ГЪ, гъ
 Abkhaz: Ҕ, ҕ
 Avar: ГЪ, гъ
 Azerbaijani: Ğ, ğ
 Bashkir: Ғ, ғ
 Crimean Tatar: Ğ, ğ (Latin), ГЪ, гъ (Cyrillic)
 Dargin (literary): ГЪ, гъ
 Kabardian: ГЪ, гъ (Cyrillic), Ğ, ğ (Latin), 
 Karachay-Balkar: ГЪ, гъ
 Karaim: ГЪ, гъ (Cyrillic), G, g (Latin)
 Karakalpak: Ǵ, ǵ (Latin), Ғ, ғ (Cyrillic)
 Kazakh: Ğ, ğ (Latin), Ғ, ғ (Cyrillic), ع (Arabic)
 Khakas: Ғ, ғ
 Kumyk: ГЪ, гъ
 Kurdish: غ (Arabic), x/ẍ (Latin)
 Kyrgyz: Г, г (Cyrillic), ع (Arabic)
 Lak: ГЪ, гъ
 Laz: ღ (Georgian), Ğ, ğ (Latin)
 Lezgi: ГЪ, гъ
 Nogai: Г, г
 Yakut: Ҕ, ҕ
 Tajik: Ғ, ғ
 Talysh: Ğ, ğ (Latin), غ (Persian), Ғ, ғ (Cyrillic)
 Tat: Ğ, ğ (Latin), ГЪ, гъ (Cyrillic)
 Tatar: Г, г (Cyrillic), Ğ, ğ (Latin)
 Tsakhur: ГЪ, гъ (Cyrillic), Ğ, ğ (Latin)
 Turkmen: G, g
 Tuvan: Г, г
 Udin: Ğ, ğ (Latin), ГЪ, гъ (Cyrillic)
 Urum: Ґ, ґ; Ғ, ғ
 Uyghur: غ (Arabic), Ғ, ғ (Cyrillic), Gh, gh (Latin)
 Uzbek: Gʻ, gʻ (Latin), Ғ, ғ (Cyrillic)

Unicode
In Unicode, the majuscule Ƣ is encoded in the Latin Extended-B block at U+01A2 and the minuscule ƣ is encoded at U+01A3. The assigned names, "LATIN CAPITAL LETTER OI" and "LATIN SMALL LETTER OI" respectively, are acknowledged by the Unicode Consortium to be mistakes, as gha is unrelated to the letters O and I. The Unicode Consortium therefore has provided the character name aliases "LATIN CAPITAL LETTER GHA" and "LATIN SMALL LETTER GHA".

Computing codes

In popular culture 
Thomas Pynchon's novel Gravity's Rainbow features an episode purporting to be the story of a Soviet officer, Tchitcherine, dispatched to Kirghizstan to serve on a committee tasked with devising an alphabet for the Kirghiz language. Tchitcherine's particular contribution is the invention of the letter Ƣ, which is thus perhaps the only obsolete letter of a Central Asian language that may be familiar to the non-specialist, English-reading public through a widely circulated novel.

References 

Gha